Ansaldi was an Italian automobile manufacturer founded in Milan in 1904 by Michele Ansaldi an engineer, designer, and industrialist. The only car they produced was sold as the F.I.A.T. Brevetti after the company was taken over in 1905.

In 1904 the Ansaldi automobile company in Milan manufactured a small car with a Fiat 10/12 HP engine. It featured the world's first 'pre-formed' chassis, plus a drive shaft and differential unit with bevelled gears and universal joints.

In 1905 Fiat bought Ansaldi and launched the car as the Fiat-Ansaldi 10-12 HP. In 1906 it was renamed the Fiat Societa-Brevetti, and 1,600 were produced by 1912 with the Fiat Brevetti 2.

See also 
 Ceirano GB & C
 Itala, car manufacturer based in Turin from 1904–1934, started in 1903 by Matteo Ceirano and five partners.

References

This article contains some information translated from the French Wikipedia.

External links
Image of 1907 Fiat Brevetti Landualet

Italian automotive pioneers
Defunct motor vehicle manufacturers of Italy
Vehicle manufacturing companies established in 1904
Italian companies established in 1906
Turin motor companies
Fiat
Brass Era vehicles
1900s cars